Safecracker: The Ultimate Puzzle Adventure is a 2006 puzzle adventure game developed by Kheops Studio and published by The Adventure Company. It is the spiritual successor to Daydream Software's 1997 title Safecracker.

Safecracker was also released on Steam on August 29, 2007. It was included in Humble Bundle's Humble Weekly Sale: The Adventure Company and Friends. On February 2, 2007, PC Gamer awarded SafeCracker "Best puzzle game of 2007".

Gameplay and plot
The game is a first person adventure game, where the player moves through 3D environments, to find the safes to crack. The safes themselves vary in style and design, from safe to safe.

The games story revolves around a safe cracker, being hired by the family of a recently deceased billionaire and oil magnate, Duncan W. Adams. The player has been employed to find the will of Duncan W. Adams, by cracking the 35 safes that were in his possession.

Development
Safecracker: The Ultimate Puzzle Adventure was first conceived in early 2006, when DreamCatcher Interactive queried Kheops Studio about developing a game in the style of Daydream Software's Safecracker. According to Kheops' Benoît Hozjan, the idea arose because the original had been a hit for the publisher. Kheops responded with a pitch for the game and suggested a plot based on locating a will. The puzzle-based design was a departure for the team: Hozjan wrote that Kheops had previously focused on "exploration and story" in addition to puzzles, in titles such as Return to Mysterious Island and Voyage: Inspired by Jules Verne. The transition proved difficult.

DreamCatcher's Adventure Company announced Safecracker in April 2006. The game was reported to be a spiritual sequel to Daydream's title, rather than a strict follow-up. In May, Hozjan estimated that it would be finished in July and "released in late summer or fall" thereafter. After going gold in July 2006, the game reached store shelves in August.

Reception
Safecracker received mixed reviews, with it being received well by PC Gamer and poorly by PC Zone, with some reviewers claiming about the difficulty curve of the game "very harsh spikes along the way" and one reviewer from PC Gamer UK calling the game "agonisingly unimaginative".

IGN reviewer Charles Onyett thought the music, voice acting, and plot were limited, though felt the puzzles were engaging.

The editors of PC Gamer awarded Safecracker their 2006 "Best Puzzle Game" award.

Notes

References

External links 
 Safecracker: The Ultimate Puzzle Adventure at MobyGames

2006 video games
Adventure games
Puzzle video games
Video games developed in France
Wii games
Nintendo DS games
Windows games
The Adventure Company games
Kheops Studio games
Single-player video games